Paul Weerman (born 21 January 1977 in Emmen, Drenthe) is a football striker from the Netherlands. He once became topscorer in the Dutch First Division for FC Emmen, scoring 14 goals in the 2001-2002 season. Weerman had short spells in Germany with SC Preußen Münster, First Vienna FC and SV Meppen. He is the son of former handball player Harry Weerman.

References
  Profile
  worldfootball

1977 births
Living people
Dutch footballers
Dutch expatriate footballers
Association football forwards
FC Emmen players
SC Veendam players
SC Cambuur players
SC Preußen Münster players
SV Meppen players
Expatriate footballers in Germany
Footballers from Emmen, Netherlands